Chaetonopsis is a genus of bristle flies in the family Tachinidae.

Species
Chaetonopsis chilensis Townsend, 1915

Distribution
United States.

References

Diptera of North America
Dexiinae
Monotypic Brachycera genera
Tachinidae genera
Taxa named by Charles Henry Tyler Townsend